Damai is an occupational caste found among Khas people. They comprise 45 subgroups. Their surnames take after the subgroup they belong to. People belonging to this caste are traditionally tailors and musicians. They are adept at using the naumati baja- an ensemble of nine traditional musical instruments. Damai is coined from musical instrument Damaha. The 1854 Nepalese Muluki Ain (Legal Code) categorized Damai as "Lower caste” category. Thus, the tribal designation of Khas is given only in few context to Kami, Damai and Sarki due to traditional status.

Due to many caste-based discriminations in Nepal, the government of Nepal legally abolished the caste-system and criminalized any caste-based discrimination, including "untouchability" (the ostracism of a specific caste) - in the year 1963 A.D. With Nepal's step towards freedom and equality, Nepal, previously ruled by a Hindu monarchy was a Hindu nation which has now become a secular state, and on 28 May 2008, it was declared a republic, ending it as the Hindu Kingdom with its caste-based discriminations and the untouchability roots.

According to 2011 Nepal census, Damai make up 1.8% of Nepal's population (or 472,862 peoples). Damai are categorized under "Hill Dalit" among the 9 broad social groups, along with Kami, Badi, Sarki and Gaine by the Government of Nepal.

References

Bibliography
 

Caste system in Nepal
Dalit communities